Santissimo Redentore a Valmelaina is a 20th-century parochial church and titular church in northeastern Rome, dedicated to Jesus as the Most Holy Redeemer.

History 

The church was built in 1975–78. 

On 26 November 1994, it was made a titular church to be held by a cardinal-priest. 

Cardinal-protectors
 Ersilio Tonini (1994–2013) 
 Ricardo Ezzati (2014–present)

References

External links

Titular churches
Rome Q. XVI Monte Sacro
Roman Catholic churches completed in 1977
20th-century Roman Catholic church buildings in Italy